Domhnall Ua Máille, Lord of Ui Mail and Chief of the Name, died 1176. 

Ua Máille was lord of the area around Clew Bay in what is now County Mayo. According to Knox, his pedigree is as follows:

Domnall mac Muiredhach mac Domnall Finn mac Muiredhach mac Dubhdara mac Muiredhach mac Dubhdara mac Dubhdara mac Flannabhra mac Seachnusach mac Maille mac Conall.

Domhnall himself is given a son, Brian, who had sons Domnall Ruadh Ó Máille (died 1337) and Diarmait.

See also

 Grace O'Malley, c.1530-c.1603, "Pirate Queen of Connacht."
 Óró Sé do Bheatha 'Bhaile

Family tree

    Domhnall Ua Máille, died 1176.
    |
    |
    Brian
    |
    |
    Diarmait
    |
    |
   Eoghan mac Diarmait Ó Máille
     |
     |_
     |         |       |      |      |       |           |            |        |       |      |         |
     |         |       |      |      |       |           |            |        |       |      |         |
  Diarmait  Domnall  Conor  Maine  Brian  Ruaidhri  Maelsechlainn  Donchadh  Tomas  Maghnus  Aedh  Tadhg Ballach
     |         |       |
     |         |       |__
     |         |       |             |           |             |
     |         |       |             |           |             |
     |         |      Dubhgall   Muiredhach   Tuathal   Maelsechlainn (died 1396)
     |         |
     |         |__
     |         |                           |       |          |             |
     |         |                           |       |          |             |
     |       Cormac Cruinn Ó Máille  Eoghan  Brian  Cormac Buadhach   Ruaibh
     |             died 1384.
     |
     |___
     |           |          |         |        |
     |           |          |         |        |
     Cormac   Diarmait    Eoghan   Dubhdara   Tadhg

External links
 http://www.ucc.ie/celt/published/T100005C/

References

 The History of Mayo, pp. 388–89, T.H. Knox, 1902.

Medieval Gaels from Ireland
12th-century Irish people
Monarchs from County Mayo
Irish lords
1176 deaths
Year of birth unknown